The 6th Annual Streamy Awards was the sixth installment of the Streamy Awards honoring streaming television series. The awards were broadcast live on YouTube on October 4, 2016 from The Beverly Hilton in Beverly Hills, California. They were hosted by actor and Vine star King Bach, the first black host of the show. In contrast with the 5th Streamy Awards which was televised on VH1 as well as being livestreamed, the Streamy Awards partnered with YouTube as their official livestreaming partner due to a desire to "return to its digital roots" for the 6th Streamy Awards. The official red carpet pre-show hosted by Teala Dunn was also livestreamed on YouTube.  To represent changes in the industry within the previous few years, three new award categories were introduced: Virtual Reality and 360° Video, Live, and Feature Film. The show generated a high level of social media interest and was well received by media publications, particularly for a tribute to Christina Grimmie who had died earlier that year.

Performers 
In honor of Christina Grimmie, who was shot and killed outside of a concert venue earlier in the year, a medley of her songs was played throughout the show. The tribute was introduced by Shane Dawson and featured speeches by Dawson and Kurt Hugo Schneider. The show also contained musical performances by Biz Markie and Spencer Ludwig, and a musical sketch by Jon Cozart satirizing various social media platforms.

Winners and nominees 

 

 

The nominees were announced by GloZell Green at a ceremony in Santa Monica, California on August 24, 2016. The finalists for the Audience Choice Award categories were announced on September 21, 2016. Winners in 30 of the categories were announced on October 1, 2016 during the Official Streamys Nominee Reception at the YouTube Space LA. The remaining 14 awards were announced during the main ceremony at The Beverly Hilton on October 4, 2016. Winners of the categories were selected by the Streamys Blue Ribbon Panel except for the Audience Choice awards which were put to a public vote.

Winners are listed first, in bold.

Web series with multiple nominations and awards

Reception 
Writing for Teen Vogue, Brianna Wiest called the show "filled with amazing guests, emotional tributes, and some seriously well-deserved winners." Wiest also positively viewed the tribute to Christina Grimmie writing "It seems everyone is holding true to their word of making sure she isn't forgotten, and she deserves nothing less" and highlighting Shane Dawson's speech during the ceremony. Madeline Roth of MTV News also praised the tribute saying "Grimmie's Streamy Awards salute comes after both the Emmys and the Teen Choice Awards faced backlash from fans for not honoring the late singer. Finally, she's gotten the tribute she deserves." According to Liz Shannon Miller of IndieWire, "The show featured a number of breakout performance moments, including an emotional tribute to the late Christina Grimmie, an exuberant musical number by Spencer Ludwig and Streamys 2015 winner James Van Der Beek showing off his dance moves". Mikey Glazer of TheWrap described Jon Cozart's musical sketch satirizing social networks as a "comedy highlight of the night".

Casey Neistat, winner of the First Person award, said of the event "The beauty of it is that reality TV – the messages, the ideas, the narratives that were communicated – were always filtered through TV producers. But now, creators that are nominated for this award ... we are telling our own stories. I think there's so much integrity in that then having them sort of be dictated by others whose interests may not align." Kandee Johnson, who won in the Beauty category, also praised the event, saying "This is like the Oscars of the Internet. We really get no awards, everyone is like 'oh that little YouTube thing you do.' They look at like a joke. It's nice, someone thinks we are valuable." YouTuber Hazel Hayes criticized the lack of female nominees in a tweet saying "A few people pointed out that there are no women nominated for best director at the Streamys. Same with best writer. Little bit sad to see."

The show had a 51% increase in its livestreamed viewership compared to the previous year and a high level of social media engagement.

See also
List of Streamy Award winners

References

External links
Streamy Awards website

Streamy Awards
Streamy Awards
2016 in American television
Streamy
2016 in Internet culture